Eth from the kindred Geregye (Écs; died after 1215) was a Hungarian distinguished nobleman, who served as voivode of Transylvania and ispán (comes) of Fehér County in 1200, during the reign of King Emeric. Eth also functioned as ispán of Újvár County in 1201 and Kolozs County in 1215.

Eth was the first known member of the gens Geregye, which originated from the borderlands of Vas and Zala counties in Transdanubia. Simultaneously with his voivodeship, Eth became a landowner in Transylvania, when he was granted the first royal donations in Bihar County and the surrounding areas for his descendants, who were called the "lords of Berettyó" (or Barcău in Romanian) thereafter. His son was judge royal Paul Geregye, therefore, he was the grandfather of voivode Nicholas Geregye.

References

Sources

 
 
 

Eth
Voivodes of Transylvania
Medieval Transylvanian people
12th-century Hungarian people
13th-century Hungarian people